Tom Gullion (born July 25, 1965, Clinton, Indiana) is an American jazz saxophonist.

Gullion studied with David Baker at Indiana University. He began his professional career with trombonist J. J. Johnson. He and his wife, a classical violinist, moved to Spain, where she worked in an orchestra. Gullion recorded with the band Clunia and also provided music for movies and television. In 1995, they moved to Chicago, and Guillion attended graduate school at Northwestern University. Four years later, he released his debut solo album, Cat's Cradle (Naim, 1999).

Discography
 Cat's Cradle (Naim, 1999)
 Greens and Blues (Naim, 2003)
 Catharsis (Ting Jing, 2006)
 Carswell (Ting Jing, 2009)

References

External links
 Official site

1965 births
Living people
People from Clinton, Indiana
American jazz saxophonists
American male saxophonists
Jacobs School of Music alumni
Jazz soprano saxophonists
Jazz tenor saxophonists
Musicians from Indiana
Bienen School of Music alumni
21st-century American saxophonists
21st-century American male musicians
American male jazz musicians